Anyiarbany "Jackson" Makoi (born 3 July 2000) is a South Sudanese-Australian professional basketball player for the Sydney Kings of the Australian National Basketball League (NBL), and the South Sudan national basketball team.

Early life
Makoi was born in Egypt, however he moved to Melbourne, Australia at an early age. He moved to the United States to play high school basketball.

Professional career
On 8 September 2021, Makoi signed his first professional contract with Vrijednosnice Osijek of the Croatian HT Premijer liga.

On 21 June 2022, Makoi signed with the Sydney Kings as a development player for the 2022–23 NBL season.

National team career
Internationally, Makoi has played for the South Sudan national basketball team since 2020. He played with South Sudan at AfroBasket 2021 as the team's starting point guard. He contributed 7 points, 3 rebounds and 3 assists per game, helping the team reach the quarterfinals in its first major tournament.

References

External links
Daytona State Falcons bio
Jackson Makoi at RealGM

2000 births
Living people
Australian men's basketball players
Australian expatriate basketball people in the United States
Daytona State Falcons men's basketball players
KK Vrijednosnice Osijek players
Lee College (Texas) alumni
Point guards
South Sudanese men's basketball players
Sydney Kings players